is a Japanese actor. He is best known for the role of Gonza Kurahashi in the Garo television franchise.

Filmography

Films
Sexy Battle Girls (1986)
Time Adventure: Zeccho 5-byo Mae (1986)
Itoshino Half Moon (1987)
Ogenki kurinikku: Tatte moraimasu aka Welcome to the Ogenki Clinic (1988)
Subway Serial Rape: Lover Hunting (1988)
Zeiram (1991)
Aiyoku Shūdōin: Jukujo, Chijo, Seijo (1995)
Gamera: Guardian of the Universe (1995)
Mechanical Violator Hakaider (1995)
The Bondage Master (1996)
Jukujo no Sasoijiru: Nanbon de Mohoshii (1997)
Onna chikan sôsakan: Oshiri de shôbu! aka Sexy S.W.A.T. Team (1998) 
Gamera 3: Revenge of Iris (1999)
Tekkōki Mikazuki (2000)
Pyrokinesis (2000)
Mourning Wife (2001)
Porisu (2001)
Stacy (2001)
Godzilla, Mothra and King Ghidorah: Giant Monsters All-Out Attack (2001)
Molester's Bus 2: Heat of the Over Thirty (2002)
The Glamorous Life of Sachiko Hanai (2003)
Ashurajō no Hitomi (2005)
Deep Sea Monster Reigo (2005)
The Inugamis (2006)
Garo Special: Byakuya no Maju (2006)
The iDol (2006)
A Tale of Mari and Three Puppies (2007)
Garo: Makai no Hana (2014)
The Little House (2014)
125 Years Memory (2015)
Garo: Makai Retsuden (2016)
Sakura Guardian in the North (2018)
The Great Buddha Arrival (2018)
Restart After Come Back Home (2020)
Nezura 1964 (2021), Nagano
Inubu: The Dog Club (2021)
Nobutora (2021)
Goodbye Cruel World (2022)
Sin Clock (2023)

Television
Ultraman Max (TV series, 2005–2006)
Garo (TV series, 2005–2006)
Tenchijin (TV series, 2009)
Garo: Makai Senki (TV series, 2011/2012)
La Belle Fille Masquée Poitrine (TV series, 1990)

References

Japanese male actors
Living people
Actors from Saitama Prefecture
1951 births